Igor Nikolayevich Morozov (born December 10, 1956) is a Russian politician. He is a member of the Federation Council of the Ryazan Oblast since 2012 (from executive branch until 2017, and then from legislative branch, passing his former seat to ex-governor Oleg Kovalyov). Morozov was candidate for governor of Ryazan Oblast (in the elections in 2004 and in 2012). Expert in the field of international economic relations, the author of several scientific papers.

He speaks English, German and Persian languages.

References

External links
 Igor Morozov. Official Site

Living people
1956 births
People from Spassky District, Ryazan Oblast
Members of the Federation Council of Russia (after 2000)
Fourth convocation members of the State Duma (Russian Federation)
Communist Party of the Soviet Union members